Gerd Ragnhild Mikkelsen Pedersen (born Gerd Ragnhild Mikkelsen; 26 March 1931 – 31 August 2008) was a former Norwegian female speed skater. She won a bronze medal at the World Allround Speed Skating Championships for Women in 1951, behind Eevi Huttunen and Randi Thorvaldsen. 

She won a silver medal at the national allround championships in 1950 behind Randi Thorvaldsen, and a bronze medal in 1951.

References

External links 
 

1931 births
2008 deaths
Norwegian female speed skaters
World Allround Speed Skating Championships medalists